Eupithecia kopetdaghica is a moth in the family Geometridae. It is found in Turkmenistan.

References

Moths described in 1989
kopetdaghica
Moths of Asia